A clock ident is a form of television ident in which a clock is displayed, reading the current time, and usually alongside the logo of that particular television station. Clock idents are typically used before news bulletins and closedown, though in the past quite commonly preceded regular programming. In the United Kingdom, it is also very much associated with schools programming.

Appearance
Clock idents are typically displayed as an analogue clock, although some broadcasters have experimented with digital clocks. In particular, during the 1970s and 1980s, many ITV regions in the UK adopted digital clock designs, which are overlaid onto a coloured card using CSO. The backgrounds were generally static, but some clocks had movement. For example, Associated-Rediffusion had a spinning Adastral. The final clocks from 1995 to 1998, used by RTÉ One and RTÉ Two, were overlaid onto a video background.

The first station clocks were mechanical, but were converted to an electronically generated format in the 1980s.

A clock will usually match a TV channel's normal ident or idents; some broadcasters such as TVP from Poland and RTM from Malaysia are exceptions.

Clocks can be displayed in silence, but can also be accompanied by music or the voice of a continuity announcer giving programme information.

Usage

Europe
Traditionally, clocks have been used before programmes, as well as after programmes and at closedown or startup. Their use before news bulletins ensured that the bulletin began at the exact time dictated by the schedule.

During the late 1990s and early 2000s, digital television became commonplace and clocks began to drop out of mainstream use - delays caused by digital systems meant that clocks were a few seconds slow. Most television channels no longer sign off at night, eliminating the need for closedown clocks. BBC One formerly used the clock ident from 1980s until Easter 2002 when it changed its idents from the Balloon and Clock to the Rhythm and Movement series. One notable exception is the Welsh-language channel S4C, which used a clock until 2007 at closedown and before news bulletins. In 2015, however, Channel 4 reinstated clock idents as part of the channel's relaunch. These idents are used before news programmes.

France's public broadcasters have historically used clocks. One of the more famous examples was the clock belonging to RTF Télévision which featured a spiral clock face. Designed by Christian Houriez and introduced in December 1959 it was used throughout the 1960s.

Clocks have also been used in Germany, the Netherlands, Sweden, Denmark, Norway, and Poland, among others.

In Hungary, before 2015, MTV broadcasts clocks before MTV Híradó (their news bulletin) or other news programmes, to announce the New Year's Eve as well as before the national anthem. TV2 and its sister channel, SuperTV2,  instead broadcast a five-second countdown before their news bulletins and occasionally other programs. RTL Klub is still known to broadcast clock idents before RTL Híradó and to announce the New Year's Eve since its start in 1997.

Analogue clock idents were used in both the public RTP channels in Portugal, until a major rebranding on 28 January 2002, at which time they were replaced by less obtrusive digital clocks. Clock idents in Portugal have mostly been used before newscasts, although they were sometimes used to align programming with the schedule for continuity.

Television stations in the Czech Republic mostly use clock idents before newscasts, whose overall branding packages usually include the graphics and music for the clock. Clocks are also shown on the New Year's Eve, with Czech Television traditionally using footage of a striking clock mechanism in the lead up to midnight.  

There are clock idents also in the UK. One example is CBeebies' BBC Playtime, where the BBC logo appears in a light blue background with wind-up key noises, then the scene switches to a red clock with white eyes, a yellow face, green hands and blue numbers in a dark blue background, which ticks until it strikes and some children shout out the word "Playtime!". Then the clock shoots out star-shaped confetti, with a yellow star landing on the screen with the BBC Playtime logo appearing on it. This ident also appeared in Italy, more specifically on Rai Yoyo, but with "Playtime" replaced with "Play Children". The clock is also considered a character from the Teletubbies TV show. 

Clocks are also broadcast in Belgium, with the Smurfs partying and singing their theme song until a grandfather clock appears striking, with Papa Smurf, Mother Nature, Father Time, The Sandman, the Smurflings, Brainy, Feathers the Stork, Johan, Peewit, Clumsy, Handy, Hefty, Smurfette and Omnibus the Wizard as the possible characters, and scaring Gargamel, Azrael and Scruple away.

Asia
Clock idents are not typically used in Asia, except in a few countries.

In Japan, NHK had an iconic mechanical clock ident from 1969 to 1985. The clock had a blue background and the clock piece was white; on the face plate multiples of 3 had two bars while the other numbers had one bar. There was also an NHK logo near the clock. A variant of that clock design had a wooden background. NHK introduced many clock designs after 1985, although the classic clock as mentioned earlier continued to remain in occasional use as recently as the early-1990s. NHK still broadcasts clocks prior to the 7a.m. news, but does not do so during sign-on or sign-off since it started broadcasting 24/7 in 1989.

In China, CCTV-1 broadcasts clocks at 5 seconds before the beginning of news programs at noon (since 2016), 7pm (since 1988) and 10pm (since 1994). Clocks are also broadcast on New Year's Eve every year at 10 seconds before midnight to announce the beginning of the New Year since 1984.

In Hong Kong, clock idents were used in between programmes, especially news bulletins, although they were not used during closedowns or start-ups.

In Southeast Asia, clock idents are broadcast on a few channels in almost all countries, including Thailand, Malaysia, Singapore, Brunei and Vietnam. In Brunei, RTB broadcast clocks at sign-on (just before Brunei National Anthem as start of the channel), before their news programs, and before Islamic prayer times (Waktu Sembahyang); 4 or 5 times a day. In Cambodia, Channel TVK used to air an analogue clock ident before their TV programs in 1993–1996 and replaced by the digital clock in 1997 (started at 11h30–14h30 and resumed at 17h00–23h00).

In Indonesia, TVRI used to air clock ident before its main news programmes, notably Berita Nasional and Dunia Dalam Berita. The ident accompanied with seven-note tune that resembles the first note of Mars Pancasila (March of Pancasila). The tune is so iconic that it is included into current ident of the latter starting on 2015. However, TVRI no longer use clock idents since mid-2014.

In Malaysia, RTM broadcast clocks on sign-on and sign-off, but clocks were cancelled in 2009. Clocks on RTM had music until 1978 but on some occasions, such as before main news program, it had background music. TV3 used clocks before their news programs from 1 January 1985.

In the Philippines, channels do not display analogue clocks during closedown. DZRH News Television, ABS-CBN News Channel, DZMM TeleRadyo, PTV, CNN Philippines, IBC, Life TV, INC TV and formerly RPN, GMA, and Knowledge Channel all use digital clocks at the bottom of the screen. In the Visayas and Mindanao, there are also clock idents.

In Singapore, Mediacorp broadcast clocks before their news programs.

In Thailand, Channel 3 used to air an analogue clock ident before their news programs in 1986–1995 after Channel 3 cancelled their joint news program with Channel 9, and in sign-off sequences before it became 24 hours in 2002, but while TV3 had temporary closedowns in May 2010, TV3 did not use clock idents. Between the 1990s and 2009, Channel 3 aired digital clock video counting up to 8am and 6pm for the national anthem. Currently, clocks incorporated to Hourly News Updates on both Channel 3 (Channel 3 HD, Flash News) and Channel 3 SD (News 28). Channel 7 used clock idents in the 1990s, and again between January and February 2010 before becoming 24 hours broadcasting on 1 March 2010. Channel 11 used digital clock idents in sign-ons before becoming 24-hour broadcasting on 1 April 2008. Thai PBS used clock idents in 2016 Before Breakfast Program. Channel 5 and Modernine TV are not known to use clock idents. Voice TV using digital clock counting down for 5 seconds before morning edition of Voice News that replaced Wake Up Thailand in 2014.

In Vietnam, VTV and HTV broadcast clocks at sign-on. On VTV, digital clocks are broadcast for 3 seconds before the main news program. But Hanoi Television have broadcast a clock ident sign on 5:30am since 1997. THVL broadcast clocks at sign on until 2012.

In Israel, in the period between the 1970s and the 90s, Channel 1 showed a clock ident before Mabat (primetime news) or some other news programs, as well as sometimes during closedown. Nowadays, Israeli TV stations replace them with ads or other programs. As of recently, a short countdown ident announcing the news is played, however, since the news program starts at a much more random time, there is no clock on screen.

Australia 
Clock idents were used in Australia from the 1960s until the late 1980s by ABC-TV, as well as by a number of commercial TV stations including SAS-10 Adelaide.

ABC-TV 
The first ABC-TV clock idents were in black and white. With the introduction of colour TV in Australia in 1975, ABC-TV introduced a white clock on a brown background with "ABC Colour" branding. This later changed to a white clock on a blue background. The final iteration of the ABC-TV clock ident was a white clock on a red background, which was seen as late as 1989.

Post-Soviet states
Since the Soviet era and even to this day, there have been clock idents shown in most channels of Russia, those include the famous Channel One Analog Clock ident with music changing every 12 hours depending on the time of the day, a CGI Kremlin tower clock shown before news on RTR's Russia 1, with the respective ding-dong sounds, and other clocks from other channels, including digital clocks, with the logo on the bottom, top or elsewhere, or even without it. Clock idents are also common in all post-Soviet states to some extent.

Certain other channels, like STS, do not broadcast news programs but do show a clock sometimes between programs, at special or scheduled checks or at closedown, though a nightly closedown is rare in Russian channels since most of them are already broadcasting 24 hours a day.

After a tragedy, or on a national remembrance day, those clock idents are shown silent and their color may be changed.

The Americas

Chile 
During the 1980s and early 1990s, it was common for TV channels in Chile to have clock idents that are broadcast during some commercial breaks, and usually included a sponsorship; for example, Canal 13's clock was tied to Beiesdorf's products. Some channels also accompanied the clock with the temperature and humidity at the moment of broadcast.

Though most channels dropped clocks by the early 1990s, Canal 13 kept its clock, reformulating it to show it digitally over the respective sponsorship (which switched from Beiesdorf to Telefónica Chile). Additionally, the clock was restricted to appear only before Teletrece (its main newscast). A similar clock was introduced by competitor TVN during the mid-2000s. Both were dropped by the end of the decade, as permanent clocks were added to newscasts.

With the gradual advent of 24/7 broadcasting in Chile, Chilevisión re-introduced clock idents in 2022, being shown again during some commercial breaks, but with the time being shown digitally.

United States 
It is very rare to see clock idents in the United States on television. KCET in Los Angeles, California used one in the 1970s. 
Another rare clock ident is one with Cookie Monster moving the hands of a paper clock wrong and then placing them right. This ident also appeared in Europe, more precisely Italy.

References

External links
BBC testcards  (including clock idents)
BBC Two sign off routine (including clock ident and Test Card F), 1997

Television presentation
Time signals
Horology